Attorney General Richards may refer to:

Craig W. Richards (born 1975), Attorney General of Alaska
George Richards (Attorney General), Attorney General of Trinidad and Tobago
John Richards (Attorney General) (1790–1872), Attorney-General for Ireland
John K. Richards (1856–1909), Attorney General of Ohio
William Buell Richards (1815–1889), Attorney General for the Province of Canada

See also
General Richards (disambiguation)